Mody Traoré (born 14 July 1980) is a French retired professional footballer who played as a defender.

Career
Born in Metz, Traoré played youth football for Nancy. Apart from two loan stints at Ajaccio and Le Havre, he spent all of his career with Valenciennes.

Personal life
Traoré also holds Senegalese nationality. His brothers Dame and Mamadou are also footballers.

References

1980 births
Living people
Footballers from Metz
Association football defenders
French footballers
Valenciennes FC players
AC Ajaccio players
Le Havre AC players
Ligue 1 players
Ligue 2 players
AS Nancy Lorraine players
French sportspeople of Senegalese descent